Barney & Friends is an American children's television series targeted at children aged 2–7, created by Sheryl Leach. The series first aired on PBS on April 6, 1992 and features Barney a purple anthropomorphic dinosaur who conveys educational messages through songs and small dance routines with a friendly, huggable and optimistic attitude. The series ended on November 2, 2010, although new videos were still released on various dates after the last episode aired. Reruns aired on Sprout from 2005 until 2015, and from December 17, 2018, onward on Sprout's successor network, Universal Kids.

In 2015, a revival was announced to premiere in 2017 but was delayed into an undated launch until being re-announced as a CGI-animated series in February 2023. On October 18, 2019, Mattel Films announced that a second Barney film was to be produced; British actor Daniel Kaluuya's production company was involved.

While popular with its intended audience, Barney drew severe negative reaction from the older set, who mocked the main character in popular culture through song parodies and comedy routines such as being beaten up by NBA star Charles Barkley on an episode of Saturday Night Live. The anti-Barney phenomenon is the basis of the 2022 Peacock documentary I Love You, You Hate Me. Barney has also received lots of praise from parents for being a wholesome yet engaging show for children that delves into common, kid-friendly topics.

Origin and development
Barney was created by Sheryl Leach of Dallas, Texas. She came up with the idea of a children's program after noticing that her son outgrew Wee Sing Together, and then recognizing that there were no videos to appeal to her son. Leach then brought together a team who created a series of home videos, Barney and the Backyard Gang, initially released in 1988. The first three videos starred actress Sandy Duncan.

One day in 1991, the daughter of Connecticut Public Television executive Larry Rifkin rented one of the videos and was "mesmerized" by it. Rifkin thought the concept could be developed for PBS. Rifkin thought Barney had appeal because he was not as neurotic as Big Bird. He pitched it to CPTV president Jerry Franklin, whose preschool son also fell in love with it. Franklin and Rifkin pitched the idea to all of their colleagues with preschoolers, and they all agreed that kids would love a Barney show. Franklin and Rifkin convinced Leach to let CPTV revamp the concept for television. The show debuted as Barney & Friends in 1992. The series was produced by CPTV and Lyrick Studios (later bought by HIT Entertainment).

Although the show was a runaway hit, PBS initially opted not to provide funding beyond the initial 30-episode run. When Rifkin and other CPTV executives learned this, they wrote letters to their fellow PBS member stations urging them to get PBS to reconsider. The Lyons Group, meanwhile, sent out notices through the Barney Fan Club, telling parents to write letters and make phone calls to their local PBS stations to show their support for Barney & Friends. By the time of the yearly member stations' meeting, station executives across the country were up in arms over the prospect of one of their most popular shows being canceled. Faced with an atmosphere that Rifkin later described as "like an insurrection", PBS ultimately relented.

For several years, the show was taped at the Color Dynamics Studios facility at Greenville Avenue & Bethany Drive in Allen, Texas, after which it moved to The Studios at Las Colinas in Irving, Texas, and then Carrollton, a suburb of Dallas. The TV series and videos are currently distributed by 9 Story Media Group, Mattel Television and Universal Studios, while the TV series was produced by WNET from 2006 to 2010.

Episode format

Opening sequence
The series opens with the theme song (over clips from various episodes) and the title card before it dissolves into the school (in seasons 1 to 6) or park (in seasons 7 to 14). The children are seen doing an activity, occasionally relating to the episode's topic. They eventually cause Barney to come to life from a plush doll, transforming into the "real" Barney, how he appears in the children's imaginations.

Main sequence
Here, the main plot of the episode takes place. Barney and the children learn about the main topic of the episode, with Baby Bop, BJ, or Riff appearing during the episode and numerous songs themed relating to the subject featured in the series. The roles of Baby Bop, BJ, and Riff have grown larger in later seasons and later episodes venture outside of the school to other places within the neighborhood, and in season 13, to other countries around the world.

Closing sequence
Barney concludes with "I Love You", then the children say goodbye to him and leave. Barney dissolves back into his original stuffed form and winks to the audience. The sequence transitions to Barney Says (in seasons 1 to 8 and 12 only) where Barney, who is off-screen, narrates what he and his friends had done that day, along with still snapshots from the episode. Then Barney signs off before the credits roll. In seasons 3 to 8 and 12, he later appeared on-screen by saying, "And remember, I love you," as the first three notes of "I Love You" plays out, and waved goodbye before the credits roll.

Characters and cast

Dinosaurs
  (voiced by Bob West 1992–2000, and Dean Wendt 2001–2010; people who wore the Barney suit included David Joyner 1991-2001 and Carey Stinson): The main character is a purple and green Tyrannosaurus in stuffed animal likeness, who comes to life through a child's imagination. His theme song is "Barney is a Dinosaur", whose tune is based on "Yankee Doodle". Barney often quotes things as being "Super dee-duper". Episodes frequently end with the song "I Love You", sung to the tune of "This Old Man", which happens to be one of Barney's favorite songs. Despite being a carnivorous type dinosaur, Barney does not have a carnivore's fearsome teeth. He likes many different foods such as fruits and vegetables, but his main favorite is a peanut butter and jelly sandwich with a glass of milk.
  (voiced by Julie Johnson): A green Triceratops, who was originally two years old, but turned three in "Look at Me, I'm 3!". Baby Bop has been on the show since her debut in "Barney in Concert" on July 29, 1991. She wears a pink bow and pink ballet slippers and carries a yellow security blanket. She sings the song "My Yellow Blankey" to show how much her security blanket means to her. She likes to eat macaroni and cheese and pizza. She is the younger sister of BJ.
  (voiced by Patty Wirtz): A seven-year-old yellow Protoceratops, BJ has been on the show since September 27, 1993. He is the older brother of Baby Bop, whom he frequently calls "Sissy" and occasionally calls by her name. He sings "BJ's Song" about himself. He wears a red baseball cap and red sneakers. He lost his hat in the episode "Hats Off to BJ!". Pickles are his favorite food and he has tried them in various ways, such as on pizza.
  (voiced by Michaela Dietz): An orange six-year-old Hadrosaur, who is Baby Bop and BJ's cousin, Riff has been on the show since September 18, 2006. He wears green sneakers. His theme music is "I Hear Music Everywhere". Riff loves music and it is in almost everything he does. In the episode "Barney: Let's Go to the Firehouse", it was revealed that Riff also likes to invent things; he created a four-sound smoke detector (the first three were different alarm sounds and the final one his voice). He is shown to have an interest in marching bands and parades.

Adults and children
The adults and children on the show often appear as teachers, storytellers, or other characters.

Multiple appearances

Puppets
A lot of puppets appeared in many seasons. The most notable puppets were:
 Scooter McNutty, a brown squirrel (seasons: 4–6, 1997–2000) performed and voiced by Todd Duffey
 Miss Etta Kette, a purple bird (seasons: 4–6, 1997–2000) performed and voiced by Brice Armstrong; Armstrong also voices Beauregard the Cat in the video It's Time for Counting.
 Booker T. Bookworm, an orange worm with interests in books (season 5: 1998–1999) performed and voiced by Earl Fisher

Children

Throughout the series' run, over 100 children have appeared in the series, with most of them from the Dallas-Fort Worth metroplex. Only a small portion of these actors have made notable appearances in media since their roles, including:
 Danielle Vega: played Kim in seasons 3 to 6
 Demi Lovato: played Angela in seasons 7 to 8
 Selena Gomez: played Gianna in seasons 7 to 8
 Debby Ryan: played Debby in season 10
 Madison Pettis: played Bridget in season 10
 Jaren Lewison: played Joshua in seasons 12 to 13

Movies and specials

 Barney in Concert (1991)
 Barney's Imagination Island (1994)
 Barney Live in New York City (1994)
 Barney's Great Adventure (1998) (theatrical movie starring Trevor Morgan and Kyla Pratt)
 Barney's Big Surprise (1998)
 Barney: Let's Go to the Zoo (2001)
 Barney's Musical Castle (2001)
 Barney's Colorful World (2004)
 Untitled Barney movie (TBA) (theatrical movie produced by Daniel Kaluuya)

Airings
Other than the United States, the series has aired in Canada, Mexico and Latin America, France, Ireland, Italy, Malaysia, Spain, the United Kingdom, Japan (On English-based DVDs under the name "" and on television as simply ""), the Philippines, Turkey, Australia, and New Zealand, among others. Australian based company and distributor Southern Star handled non-US rights to the series from the mid-'90s  until 2001 when HIT revoked the deal after acquiring Lyrick.

Two known co-productions of Barney & Friends have been produced outside of the US. The Israeli co-production  Hachaverim shel Barney (The Friends of Barney) produced from 1997 to 1999 in Tel Aviv, Israel, was the first of these. Rather than dubbing the original American episodes in seasons 1 to 3, the episodes were adapted with a unique set and exclusive child actors. The second co-production was broadcast in South Korea from 2001 to 2003 on KBS (under the name "바니와 친구들" (Baniwa Chingudeul (Barney and Friends))). This one, however, adapted the first six seasons (including the first three that the Israel co-production did).

Music
A majority of the albums of Barney & Friends feature Bob West as the voice of Barney; however, the recent album The Land of Make-Believe has Dean Wendt's voice.

Barney's song "I Love You" was among those used by interrogators at Guantanamo Bay detention camp to coerce detainees.

Awards and nominations

Reception and legacy

Several people have concluded that episodes contain a great deal of age-appropriate educational material, including Yale University researchers Dorothy and Jerome Singer, who called the program a "model of what preschool television should be". Others have criticized the show for a lack of educational value, as well as being repetitive.

The show is often cited as a contributing factor to the perceived sense of entitlement seen in millennials, who grew up watching the show. One specific criticism is:

In 1992, the Barney franchise generated  in retail sales.

The creator and performer of the San Diego Chicken mascot, Ted Giannoulas, called Barney a "ubiquitous and insipid creature" in a 1999 court case.

Barney & Friends ranked No. 50 on TV Guide 2002 list of the 50 worst TV shows of all time. 

In a 1993 newspaper article, Jerry Franklin, the head of Connecticut Public Television, which co-produced Barney at the time, was quoted thus:
Howard Blumenthal, producer of Where in the World Is Carmen Sandiego?, said "Even the most knowledgeable people … can't really understand why that [Barney] phenomenon happened and another didn't".

Upcoming revival series
In November 2015, 9 Story Media Group and Mattel announced plans for a revival series to air in 2017. However, nothing else was announced about it.

After a period of silence, on February 13, 2023, Mattel announced that Barney would return as a CGI-animated series, being co-produced by Mattel and Nelvana, with the deal also including the possibility of animated films and YouTube content to feature the character. The new series will be aiming for a 2024 delivery window. This was part of a larger trend of successfully reviving franchises like Monster High and Masters of the Universe for Mattel, along with overall development that included films based on games like Hot Wheels, Magic 8 Ball, and Major Matt Mason.

See also
 Barney's Hide and Seek, Sega Genesis/Mega Drive video game
 A Day in the Park with Barney, a show and playground at Universal Studios Florida

References

Further reading

External links
  by Lyons Partnership, L.P.
 Barney & Friends on PBS Kids (U.S.)
  at Hit Entertainment
  at Lyrick Studios
 

 
1992 American television series debuts
2010 American television series endings
1990s American children's television series
2000s American children's television series
2010s American children's television series
1990s preschool education television series
2000s preschool education television series
2010s preschool education television series
American preschool education television series
American television shows featuring puppetry
American television series revived after cancellation
English-language television shows
PBS original programming
Early childhood education in the United States
Early childhood education
Television series about children
Television series about dinosaurs
Treehouse TV original programming
PBS Kids shows
Television series by WNET
Television series by Mattel Creations
HIT Entertainment
Television shows filmed in Texas